The rose hip or rosehip, also called rose haw and rose hep, is the accessory fruit of the various species of rose plant. It is typically red to orange, but ranges from dark purple to black in some species. Rose hips begin to form after pollination of flowers in spring or early summer, and ripen in late summer through autumn.

Propagation
Roses are propagated from rose hips by removing the achenes that contain the seeds from the hypanthium (the outer coating) and sowing just beneath the surface of the soil. The seeds can take many months to germinate. Most species require chilling (stratification), with some such as Rosa canina only germinating after two winter chill periods.

Use

Rose hips are used in bread and pies, jam, 
jelly, marmalade, syrup, soup, tea, wine, and other beverages.

Rose hips can be eaten raw, like berries, if care is taken to avoid the hairs inside the fruit. The hairs are used as itching powder.

A few rose species are sometimes grown for the ornamental value of their hips, such as Rosa moyesii, which has prominent, large, red bottle-shaped fruits. Rosa macrophylla 'Master Hugh' has the largest hips of any readily available rose.

Rose hips are commonly used in herbal tea, often blended with hibiscus. An oil is also extracted from the seeds. Rhodomel, a type of mead, is made with rose hips.

Rose hips can be used to make , the traditional Hungarian fruit brandy popular in Hungary, Romania, and other countries sharing Austro-Hungarian history. Rose hips are also the central ingredient of cockta, the fruity-tasting national soft drink of Slovenia.

Dried rose hips are also sold for crafts and home fragrance purposes. The Inupiat mix rose hips with wild redcurrant and highbush cranberries and boil them into a syrup.

Nutrients and phytochemicals
Wild rose hip fruits are particularly rich in vitamin C, containing 426 mg per 100 g or 0.4% by weight (w/w). However, RP-HPLC assays of fresh rose hips and several commercially available products revealed a wide range of L-ascorbic acid (vitamin C) content, ranging from 0.03 to 1.3%.

Rose hips contain the carotenoids beta-carotene, lutein, zeaxanthin and lycopene, which are under basic research for a variety of potential biological roles. Research studies showed that rosehip in the form of meal contains a significant amount of essential amino acids as well as polyunsaturated fatty acids from which the most abundant is the alpha-Linolenic acid fatty acid  However, rosehip is a powerful natural antioxidant source with multiple beneficial effects.  A meta-analysis of human studies examining the potential for rose hip extracts to reduce arthritis pain concluded there was a small effect requiring further analysis of safety and efficacy in clinical trials. Use of rose hips is not considered an effective treatment for knee osteoarthritis.

See also

Rose hip seed oil
Rose hip soup
Rose hip wine
Rose hip meal
Rosa canina
Rosa moschata
Rosa rubiginosa
Rosa gymnocarpa, the bald-hip rose

References

External links

Fruit morphology
Herbal tea
Roses
Food ingredients